The 2017 Idaho State Bengals football team represented Idaho State University as a member of the Big Sky Conference during the 2017 NCAA Division I FCS football season. Led by first-year head coach Rob Phenicie, the Bengals compiled an overall record of 4–7 with a mark of 2–6 in conference play, placing in a three-way tie for ninth in the Big Sky. Idaho State played their home games at Holt Arena in Pocatello, Idaho.

Schedule

Game summaries

Western Oregon

at Utah State

at Nevada

Idaho State’s first win over an FBS team since 2000 against Utah State

at Northern Colorado

Cal Poly

Montana

at Sacramento State

Portland State

at Montana State

UC Davis

at Weber State

References

Idaho State
Idaho State Bengals football seasons
Idaho State Bengals football